A telomere is a region of repetitive nucleotide sequences associated with specialized proteins at the ends of linear chromosomes. Telomeres are a widespread genetic feature most commonly found in eukaryotes. In most, if not all species possessing them, they protect the terminal regions of chromosomal DNA from progressive degradation and ensure the integrity of linear chromosomes by preventing DNA repair systems from mistaking the very ends of the DNA strand for a double-strand break.

Discovery 
In the early 1970s, Soviet theorist Alexei Olovnikov first recognized that chromosomes could not completely replicate their ends; this is known as the "end replication problem". Building on this, and accommodating Leonard Hayflick's idea of limited somatic cell division, Olovnikov suggested that DNA sequences are lost every time a cell replicates until the loss reaches a critical level, at which point cell division ends.

In 1975–1977, Elizabeth Blackburn, working as a postdoctoral fellow at Yale University with Joseph G. Gall, discovered the unusual nature of telomeres, with their simple repeated DNA sequences composing chromosome ends. Blackburn, Carol Greider, and Jack Szostak were awarded the 2009 Nobel Prize in Physiology or Medicine for the discovery of how chromosomes are protected by telomeres and the enzyme telomerase.

In 1983, Barbara McClintock, an American cytogeneticist and the first woman to receive an unshared Nobel Prize in Physiology or Medicine, received the Nobel Prize for observing that the chromosomes lacking end parts became "sticky" and hypothesized the existence of a special structure at the chromosome tip that would maintain chromosome stability.

Structure and function

End replication problem 
 

During DNA replication, DNA polymerase cannot replicate the sequences present at the 3' ends of the parent strands. This is a consequence of its unidirectional mode of DNA synthesis: it can only attach new nucleotides to an existing 3'-end (that is, synthesis progresses 5'-3') and thus it requires a primer to initiate replication. On the leading strand (oriented 5'-3' within the replication fork), DNA-polymerase continuously replicates from the point of initiation all the way to the strand's end with the primer (made of RNA) then being excised and substituted by DNA. The lagging strand, however, is oriented 3'-5' with respect to the replication fork so continuous replication by DNA-polymerase is impossible, which necessitates discontinuous replication involving the repeated synthesis of primers further 5' of the site of initiation (see  lagging strand replication). The last primer to be involved in lagging-strand replication sits near the 3'-end of the template (corresponding to the potential 5'-end of the lagging-strand). Originally it was believed that the last primer would sit at the very end of the template, thus, once removed, the DNA-polymerase that substitutes primers with DNA (DNA-Pol δ in eukaryotes) would be unable to synthesize the "replacement DNA" from the 5'-end of the lagging strand so that the template nucleotides previously paired to the last primer would not be replicated. It has since been questioned whether the last lagging strand primer is placed exactly at the 3'-end of the template and it was demonstrated that it is rather synthesized at a distance of about 70-100 nucleotides which is consistent with the finding that DNA in cultured human cell is shortened by 50-100 base pairs per cell division.

If coding sequences are degraded in this process, potentially vital genetic code would be lost. Telomeres are non-coding, repetitive sequences located at the termini of linear chromosomes to act as buffers for those coding sequences further behind. They "cap" the end-sequences and are progressively degraded in the process of DNA replication.

The "end replication problem" is exclusive to linear chromosomes as circular chromosomes do not have ends lying without reach of DNA-polymerases. Most prokaryotes, relying on circular chromosomes, accordingly do not possess telomeres. A small fraction of bacterial chromosomes (such as those in Streptomyces, Agrobacterium, and Borrelia), however, are linear and possess telomeres, which are very different from those of the eukaryotic chromosomes in structure and function. The known structures of bacterial telomeres take the form of proteins bound to the ends of linear chromosomes, or hairpin loops of single-stranded DNA at the ends of the linear chromosomes.

Telomere ends and shelterin 

At the very 3'-end of the telomere there is a 300 base pair overhang which can invade the double-stranded portion of the telomere forming a structure known as a T-loop. This loop is analogous to a knot, which stabilizes the telomere, and prevents the telomere ends from being recognized as breakpoints by the DNA repair machinery. Should non-homologous end joining occur at the telomeric ends, chromosomal fusion would result. The T-loop is maintained by several proteins, collectively referred to as the shelterin complex. In humans, the shelterin complex consists of six proteins identified as TRF1, TRF2, TIN2, POT1, TPP1, and RAP1. In many species, the sequence repeats are enriched in guanine, e.g. TTAGGG in vertebrates, which allows the formation of G-quadruplexes, a special conformation of DNA involving non-Watson-Crick base pairing. There are different subtypes depending on the involvement of single- or double-stranded DNA, among other things. There is evidence for the 3'-overhang in ciliates (that possess telomere repeats similar to those found in vertebrates) to form such G-quadruplexes that accommodate it, rather than a T-loop. G-quadruplexes present an obstacle for enzymes such as DNA-polymerases and are thus thought to be involved in the regulation of replication and transcription.

Telomerase 

Many organisms have an ribonucleoprotein enzyme called telomerase, which carries out the task of adding repetitive nucleotide sequences to the ends of the DNA. Telomerase "replenishes" the telomere "cap" and requires no ATP In most multicellular eukaryotic organisms, telomerase is active only in germ cells, some types of stem cells such as embryonic stem cells, and certain white blood cells. Telomerase can be reactivated and telomeres reset back to an embryonic state by somatic cell nuclear transfer. The steady shortening of telomeres with each replication in somatic (body) cells may have a role in senescence and in the prevention of cancer. This is because the telomeres act as a sort of time-delay "fuse", eventually running out after a certain number of cell divisions and resulting in the eventual loss of vital genetic information from the cell's chromosome with future divisions.

Length 

Telomere length varies greatly between species, from approximately 300 base pairs in yeast to many kilobases in humans, and usually is composed of arrays of guanine-rich, six- to eight-base-pair-long repeats. Eukaryotic telomeres normally terminate with 3′ single-stranded-DNA overhang ranging from 75-300 bases, which is essential for telomere maintenance and capping. Multiple proteins binding single- and double-stranded telomere DNA have been identified. These function in both telomere maintenance and capping. Telomeres form large loop structures called telomere loops, or T-loops. Here, the single-stranded DNA curls around in a long circle, stabilized by telomere-binding proteins. At the very end of the T-loop, the single-stranded telomere DNA is held onto a region of double-stranded DNA by the telomere strand disrupting the double-helical DNA, and base pairing to one of the two strands. This triple-stranded structure is called a displacement loop or D-loop.

Shortening

Oxidative damage 

Apart from the end replication problem, in vitro studies have shown that telomeres accumulate damage due to oxidative stress and that oxidative stress-mediated DNA damage has a major influence on telomere shortening in vivo. There is a multitude of ways in which oxidative stress, mediated by reactive oxygen species (ROS), can lead to DNA damage; however, it is yet unclear whether the elevated rate in telomeres is brought about by their inherent susceptibility or a diminished activity of DNA repair systems in these regions. Despite widespread agreement of the findings, widespread flaws regarding measurement and sampling have been pointed out; for example, a suspected species and tissue dependency of oxidative damage to telomeres is said to be insufficiently accounted for. Population-based studies have indicated an interaction between anti-oxidant intake and telomere length. In the Long Island Breast Cancer Study Project (LIBCSP), authors found a moderate increase in breast cancer risk among women with the shortest telomeres and lower dietary intake of beta carotene, vitamin C or E. These results  suggest that cancer risk due to telomere shortening may interact with other mechanisms of DNA damage, specifically oxidative stress.

Association with aging 

Telomere shortening is associated with aging, mortality, and aging-related diseases. Based upon comparison between individuals of different ages, telomere length is negatively associated with the number of cell divisions in germ and tumor cells. This leads to the link between age and telomere length, as one might expect, the older an individual is the more times their cells have replicated their genome and divided. In contrast to humans, mice have been demonstrated to have significantly longer telomeres. This could demonstrate how the effects of telomere shortening might have a different or no effect on other eukaryotes, as the older mice had no significant difference in telomere length than younger mice. Furthermore, the role and importance of telomeres appears to have varying degrees of importance among model organisms. Common model organisms such as mice, S. cerevisiae, and C. elegans, were able to withstand the knockdown of telomerase with little effect for multiple generations. Despite the resiliency of these eukaryotes, a decrease in telomerase function in humans resulted in multiple threatening complications after only a few generations. This carries implications on the importance of preserving telomeres in human health.
	
The age of a father plays a role in the length of a child's telomeres, which has evolutionary implications. Although leukocyte telomeres shorten with age, sperm telomeres lengthen with age. Shorter telomeres are theorized to impose lower energy costs (due to less replication) but also have immune system-related and other aging- and disease-related costs, so the effect of paternal age on telomere length might be an adaptation to increase the chances that the child will be fit for the environment they're born into. Telomerase is normally triggered by cancer cells, however in some cases, cancer cells use a mechanism called alternative telomere lengthening to retain telomeres.

Potential effect of psychological stress 

Meta-analyses found that increased perceived psychological stress was associated with a small decrease in telomere length—but that these associations attenuate to no significant association when accounting for publication bias. The literature concerning telomeres as integrative biomarkers of exposure to stress and adversity is dominated by cross-sectional and correlational studies, which makes causal interpretation problematic. A 2020 review argued that the relationship between psychosocial stress and telomere length appears strongest for stress experienced in utero or early life.

Lengthening 

The phenomenon of limited cellular division was first observed by Leonard Hayflick, and is now referred to as the Hayflick limit. Significant discoveries were subsequently made by a group of scientists organized at Geron Corporation by Geron's founder Michael D. West, that tied telomere shortening with the Hayflick limit. The cloning of the catalytic component of telomerase enabled experiments to test whether the expression of telomerase at levels sufficient to prevent telomere shortening was capable of immortalizing human cells. Telomerase was demonstrated in a 1998 publication in Science to be capable of extending cell lifespan, and now is well-recognized as capable of immortalizing human somatic cells.

Two studies on long-lived seabirds demonstrate that the role of telomeres is far from being understood. In 2003, scientists observed that the telomeres of Leach's storm-petrel (Oceanodroma leucorhoa) seem to lengthen with chronological age, the first observed instance of such behaviour of telomeres.

A study reported that telomere length of different mammalian species correlates inversely rather than directly with lifespan, and  concluded that the contribution of telomere length to lifespan remains controversial. There is little evidence that, in humans, telomere length is a significant biomarker of normal aging with respect to important cognitive and physical abilities.

Sequences 
Known, up-to-date telomere nucleotide sequences are listed in Telomerase Database website.

Research on disease risk 

Telomeres are critical for maintaining genomic integrity and may be factors for age-related diseases. Laboratory studies show that telomere dysfunction or shortening is commonly acquired due the process of cellular aging and tumor development. The function of telomeres is widely accepted as a buffer against tumor growth, to protect chromosome structure, and prevent the loss of vital genetic information during replication. While telomeres keep the growth and division of somatic cells in check, this can inadvertently select for rapidly dividing cells that have suffered telomere damage. As other cells divide as they are supposed to, the abnormal cells divide much quicker, outcompeting the undamaged cells, while acquiring more DNA damage that could further increase their ability to grow. This results in tumor formation.

Certain lifestyle factors have been shown to prematurely shorten telomere length. Smoking is negatively correlated to telomere length. The average human loses roughly 25-27 base pairs per year due to telomere shortening. A study of telomere length in white blood cells of chronic smokers revealed an additional 5 base pairs lost per year. Obesity is another factor that contributes to accelerated telomere shortening. It is well established that obesity causes increased oxidative stress. Ultimately, this increased oxidative damage can impair DNA and, consequently, reduce telomere length. Furthermore, dietary intake and physical activity decrease the rate of telomere shortening. An increase in consumption of antioxidants such as omega-3 fatty acids, vitamins E, C, and beta-carotene can reduce oxidative stress on DNA. Women with diets consisting of a high intake of these antioxidants revealed longer telomere length and a decreased risk in breast cancer. In relation to obesity, exercise promotes metabolization of fat and detrimental waste products, as well as increases the activity of telomerase. Moreover, physical activity decreases the expression of proteins associated with apoptosis (p53 and p16) in mice populations, which indicates reduced levels of oxidative stress and thereby telomere shortening. 

Observational studies have found shortened telomeres in many types of experimental cancers. In addition, people with cancer have been found to possess shorter leukocyte telomeres than healthy controls. In 2011, meta-analyses suggested 1.4 to 3.0 fold increased risk of cancer for those with the shortest vs. longest telomeres.

Telomeres also exist as a possible drug target. While telomeres serve a vital function in humans, telomerase activity is generally low in most somatic cells and tissues. This provides a unique avenue for targeting eukaryotic pathogens. There are many parasitic strains of eukaryotes such as protozoans and infectious yeast that heavily rely upon telomerase activity to monitor their genome. Since normal telomerase activity in most human cells is low, targeting parasitic telomerase function might be a successful short-term treatment against pathogenic eukaryotes, without causing harm to the host.

Measurement 

Several techniques are currently employed to assess average telomere length in eukaryotic cells. One method is the Terminal Restriction Fragment (TRF) southern blot. A Real-Time PCR assay for telomere length involves determining the Telomere-to-Single Copy Gene (T/S) ratio, which is demonstrated to be proportional to the average telomere length in a cell.

Tools have also been developed to estimate the length of telomere from whole genome sequencing (WGS) experiments. Amongst these are TelSeq, Telomerecat and telomereHunter. Length estimation from WGS typically works by differentiating telomere sequencing reads and then inferring the length of telomere that produced that number of reads. These methods have been shown to correlate with preexisting methods of estimation such as PCR and TRF. Flow-FISH is used to quantify the length of telomeres in human white blood cells. A semi-automated method for measuring the average length of telomeres with Flow FISH was published in Nature Protocols in 2006.

While multiple companies offer telomere length measurement services, the utility of these measurements for widespread clinical or personal use has been questioned. Nobel Prize winner Elizabeth Blackburn, who was co-founder of one company, promoted the clinical utility of telomere length measures.

In wildlife 

During the last two decades, eco-evolutionary studies have investigated the relevance of life-history traits and environmental conditions on telomeres of wildlife. Most of these studies have been conducted in endotherms, i.e. birds and mammals. They have provided evidence for the inheritance of telomere length; however, heritability estimates vary greatly within and among species. Age and telomere length often negatively correlate in vertebrates, but this decline is variable among taxa and linked to the method used for estimating telomere length. In contrast, the available information shows no sex differences in telomere length across vertebrates. Phylogeny and life history traits such as body size or the pace of life can also affect telomere dynamics. For example, it has been described across species of birds and mammals. In 2019, a meta-analysis confirmed that the exposure to stressors (e.g. pathogen infection, competition, reproductive effort and high activity level) was associated with shorter telomeres across different animal taxa. Telomeres are also a candidate health biomarker for ecotoxicology studies, however, their use still needs further validation as the current literature is taxonomically biased and limited by a reduced number of experimental and longitudinal approaches.

Although ca. 80% of living animals are ectotherms, the knowledge about telomere dynamics in these species is still limited to a few studies in reptiles, fish, and amphibians, whereas invertebrates telomeres have been virtually not explored. Ectotherms are significantly more likely than endotherms to have variation in somatic telomerase expression. For instance, in many fish, telomerase occurs throughout the body (and associated with this, telomere length is roughly the same across all its tissue). Studies on ectotherms, and other non-mammalian organisms, show that there is no single universal model of telomere erosion; rather, there is wide variation in relevant dynamics across Metazoa, and even within smaller taxonomic groups these patterns appear diverse. Due to the different reproductive timelines of some ectotherms, selection on disease is relevant for a much larger fraction of these creatures’ lives than it is for mammals, so early- and late-life telomere length, and their possible links to cancer, seem especially important in these species from a life history theory point of view. Indeed, ectotherms are more sensitive to environmental variation than endotherms and factors such as temperature are known to their growth and maturation rates, thus, ectothermic telomeres are predicted to be greatly affected by climate change.

See also 

Epigenetic clock
Centromere
DNA damage theory of aging
Immortality
Maximum life span
Rejuvenation (aging)
Senescence, biological aging
Tankyrase
Telomere-binding protein
G-quartet
Immortal DNA strand hypothesis

Notes

References

External links 

Telomeres and Telomerase: The Means to the End Nobel Lecture by Elizabeth Blackburn, which includes a reference to the impact of stress, and pessimism on telomere length
Telomerase and the Consequences of Telomere Dysfunction Nobel Lecture by Carol Greider
DNA Ends: Just the Beginning Nobel Lecture by Jack Szostak

Chromosomes
Molecular biology
Repetitive DNA sequences
 
Non-coding DNA